Brest Arena is a multi-purpose arena in Brest, France. Its tenant is Brest Bretagne Handball.

Events
 2017 World Men's Handball Championship
 2018 European Women's Handball Championship

References

External links
 Official website

Indoor arenas in France
Basketball venues in France
Handball venues in France
Music venues in France
Boxing venues in France
Buildings and structures in Brest, France
Sports venues completed in 2014
2014 establishments in France
Music venues completed in 2014
Sport in Brest, France
Sports venues in Finistère
21st-century architecture in France